Toastmaster (sometimes called "Toastmaster Magazine" or "The Toastmaster") is a monthly magazine published by Toastmasters International. The magazine promotes the ideas and goals of Toastmasters International. The publisher is Toastmasters International Inc., based in Rancho Santa Margarita, CA.

References

External links
 

Monthly magazines published in the United States
English-language magazines
Magazines published in California